Johann Friedrich Leybold (18 June 1755, Stuttgart - 13 November 1838, Vienna) was a German miniaturist painter and copper engraver.

Biography 
He was the son of a Master baker. As a young employee of the porcelain factory in Ludwigsburg, his supervisors noticed his artistic skills and recommended that his father allow him to take drawing lessons. This was agreed to, and he began his studies with a local sculptor, then attended an art school in Stuttgart. After that, he and two other students were assigned to work with the court stucco  maker, decorating Solitude Palace. In 1770, all three were accepted into the new military painting school. In 1773, the painting school expanded and became the Military Academy. The following year, a copper engraving school was added and Johann Gotthard von Müller was named its Director. Leybold became his first student and, later, his assistant. 

He was named the Court Engraver in 1781 so, rather than study abroad, he remained in Stuttgart. Despite this appointment, his main source of income appears to have been miniature portrait painting. 

In 1789, he was given a professorship in drawing and modeling at the Hohe Karlsschule, an offshoot of the Military Academy. However, when Duke Charles Eugene died, in 1793, everyone who had been employed by him lost their jobs. Leybold was given promises that he would eventually be reinstated, but he never was. In 1797, he received an appointment as Court Engraver in Saxe-Coburg, but this produced little income, so he moved to Vienna in 1798.

Over the next five years, he once again supported himself and his family as a miniaturist. These works helped him make the acquaintance of Heinrich Füger, Director of the Belvedere Gallery, who commissioned him to provide several illustrations for Der Messias, by Friedrich Gottlieb Klopstock. 

Shortly after, he was appointed a Professor at the copper engraving school and became a member of the Academic Council.

Four of his sons also became artists: Karl Jakob Theodor,  and Rudolf Moritz (1806-1857).

Sources 
 Biography, from the Biographisches Lexikon des Kaiserthums Oesterreich @ WikiSource

External links 

More works by Leybold @ the British Museum

1755 births
1838 deaths
German artists
Miniature painting
German engravers
German illustrators
Artists from Stuttgart